Someshwara Temple is a Hindu temple in Marathahalli, Bangalore, Karnataka, India, dedicated to the Lord Siva.

References 

Religious buildings and structures completed in 1508
16th-century Hindu temples
Chola architecture
Hindu temples in Bangalore